Royal Oak Mall is a shopping centre in Royal Oak, Auckland, New Zealand which was expanded in the mid-1980s.

References

External links
 Royal Oak Mall Official website

Buildings and structures in Auckland
Shopping centres in the Auckland Region